Halifax Academy building, or Alliance Atlantis Academy, is a Victorian era building located in downtown Halifax, Nova Scotia. It is a registered heritage property.

Heritage value
It was built in 1877 for use as a high school, the Halifax Academy. In 1883  Dalhousie University rented two rooms in which to house the newly founded Dalhousie Law School.

It is a three-storey, red brick building built in the Second Empire style.  It was designed by Henry Busch, a proponent of the style, and prominent Halifax architect. Andrew Cobb designed an extension in 1917.

Modern day
In 2003 Alliance Atlantis donated the building to NSCAD University who have used it for their film program since 2004.

References

Historic buildings and structures in Canada